The 2016 African Women's Handball Championship was the 22nd edition of the African Women's Handball Championship, held in Luanda, Angola from 28 November to 7 December 2016. It acted as the African qualifying tournament for the 2017 World Women's Handball Championship.

This was the first time in the history of the African championships that the male and female editions were organized in two different countries at different times. While men and women competitions were traditionally gathered in the same installations every two years in January, The African Handball Confederation (CAHB) had decided to separate the two competitions after several votes at a meeting on 23 January 2015 at the Abbasside Palace hotel in Algiers.

Venue

Qualification

1 Bold indicates champion for that year. Italics indicates host.

Draw

Squads

Preliminary round
Times are local (UTC+1).

Group A

Group B

Knockout stage

Bracket

5–8th place bracket

Quarterfinals

5–8th place semifinals

Semifinals
After the semifinals, Senegal was disqualified from the tournament for using ineligible player Doungou Camara, since she has already played for the French national team. Tunisia faced Angola in the final and Cameroon automatically occupied the third place.

Seventh place game

Fifth place game

Third place game

Final

Final ranking

Awards

Angolese Natália Bernardo is the Best Player and Tunisian Amal Hamrouni is the top scorer with 40 goals.

All-Tournament Team
All-star team is

References

External links
Official website
Results on todor66.com

2016 Women
African Women's Handball Championship
African Women's Handball Championship
H
2016 in African handball
African Women's
Africa Women's
2016 in African women's sport